Isaac Williams Jr. (April 5, 1777 in Goshen, Litchfield County, Connecticut – November 9, 1860 in Cooperstown, Otsego County, New York) was an American politician from New York.

Life
He received a limited schooling, and in 1793 moved with his father to Otsego County, New York. He was appointed Undersheriff of Otsego County in 1810, and Sheriff in 1811, remaining in office until 1813.

He successfully contested as a Democratic-Republican the election of Federalist John M. Bowers to the 13th United States Congress to fill the vacancy caused by the death of Representative-elect William Dowse (1770–1813), and served from January 24, 1814, to March 3, 1815. Williams was elected again, to the 15th United States Congress, holding office from March 4, 1817 to March 3, 1819. He was then elected again, to the 18th United States Congress, holding office from March 4, 1823, to March 3, 1825.

He was buried at the Warren Cemetery, in Otsego, New York.

References

1777 births
1860 deaths
People from Goshen, Connecticut
People from Cooperstown, New York
Sheriffs of Otsego County, New York
Democratic-Republican Party members of the United States House of Representatives from New York (state)